Hemigomphus cooloola is a species of dragonfly in the family Gomphidae, 
known as the Wallum vicetail. 
It is a small, black and yellow dragonfly, endemic to south-eastern Queensland, Australia, where it inhabits sandy, slow streams and lakes.

Gallery

See also
 List of Odonata species of Australia

References

Gomphidae
Odonata of Australia
Insects of Australia
Endemic fauna of Australia
Taxa named by J.A.L. (Tony) Watson
Insects described in 1991